Society for Sale is a 1918 American silent drama film directed by Frank Borzage and starring William Desmond and Gloria Swanson. It is not known whether the film currently survives, which suggests that it is a lost film.

Plot
As described in a film magazine, the Honorable Billy (Desmond), through his love for Vi Challoner (West) and its attendant expense, finds himself in financial straits and is deserted by the cause of his trouble. In his plight he is approached by Phyllis Clyne (Swanson), who wishes to be introduced into society and is willing to pay for the deception. Honorable Billy seeks to break the agreement when Phyllis apparently becomes enamored with Lord Sheldon (Prior), whose affairs are the subject of gossip. She refuses him his liberty and accuses him of jealousy. After an automobile crash in which Lord Sheldon is killed, she confesses to Billy that he was her father. She then convinces Billy that their engagement should be permanent.

Cast
 William Desmond as Honorable Billy
 Gloria Swanson as Phyllis Clyne
 Herbert Prior as Lord Sheldon
 Charles Dorian as Furnival
 Lillian West as Vi Challoner
 Lillian Langdon as Lady Mary

Reception
Like many American films of the time, Society for Sale was subject to cuts by city and state film censorship boards. For example, the Chicago Board of Censors cut, in Reel 4, four near views of a woman in low-cut gown seated on couch with Furnival.

References

External links

1918 films
1918 drama films
Silent American drama films
American silent feature films
American black-and-white films
Films directed by Frank Borzage
Triangle Film Corporation films
1910s American films